Back slang is an English coded language in which the written word is spoken phonemically backwards.

Usage
Back slang is thought to have originated in Victorian England. It was used mainly by market sellers, such as butchers and greengrocers, for private conversations behind their customers' backs and to pass off lower-quality goods to less-observant customers. The first published reference to it was in 1851, in Henry Mayhew's London Labour and the London Poor. Some back slang has entered Standard English. For example, the term yob was originally back slang for "boy". Back slang is not restricted to words spoken phonemically backwards.  English frequently makes use of diphthongs, which is an issue for back slang since diphthongs cannot be reversed. The resulting fix slightly alters the traditional back slang. An example is trousers and its diphthong, ou, which is replaced with wo in the back slang version reswort.

Back slang is said to be used in prisons by inmates to make it more difficult for prison wardens to listen into prisoners' conversations and find out what is being said.

In 2010, back slang was reported to have been adopted for the sake of privacy on foreign tennis courts by the young English players Laura Robson and Heather Watson.

 French verlan, in which e.g. français [fʁɑ̃sɛ] becomes céfran [sefʁɑ̃];
 French louchébem, which relies on syllables inversion too, but also adds extra syllables;
Greek podana (e.g. the word βυζί becomes ζυβί);
IsiXhosa & isiZulu Ilwimi/Ulwimi used mostly by teenagers, often called "high school language";
Japanese tougo (倒語), where moras of a word are inverted and vowels sometimes become long vowels (hara, “stomach”, becomes raaha);
 Romanian Totoiana, in which syllables of Romanian words are inverted so that other Romanian speakers can not understand it;
 Lunfardo, a Spanish argot spoken in Argentina, includes words in vesre (from revés, literally "backwards");
 Šatrovački, a Serbo-Croatian-Bosnian slang system;
 19th century Swedish (e.g. the word fika, which means approximately "coffee break").

See also
 Costermonger (British street vendors from whom back slang originates)
 Pig Latin

References

External links

 Victorian Web Article
 John Burkardt's list of back slang words at Florida State University

English-based argots
English language in England
Language games
British slang